The Men's omnium competition at the 2022 UCI Track Cycling World Championships was held on 15 October 2022.

Results

Scratch race
The scratch race was started at 13:17.

Tempo race
The tempo race was started at 15:40.

Elimination race
The elimination race was started at 19:41.

Points race and overall standings
The points race was started at 19:41.

References

Men's omnium